Midega Tola  is a district of Oromia, Ethiopia.

See also 

 Districts of Ethiopia
Midaga Tola(Midaga Lola), East Hararghe Zone,  Oromia, Ethiopia

References 

Districts of Oromia Region